1,1-Diethoxyethane (acetaldehyde diethyl acetal) is a major flavoring component of distilled beverages, especially malt whisky and sherry. Although it is just one of many compounds containing an acetal functional group, this specific chemical is sometimes called simply acetal.

References 

Acetals
Distilled drinks